Hotel Wangchuck is a hotel in Thimphu, Bhutan, located in the heart of the city on the Chang Lam, overlooking the Changlimithang Stadium. The hotel, named after the Bhutanese King at the time, Jigme Singye Wangchuck, currently King-Father, and has 20 rooms and a restaurant serving a variety of cuisines.

References

Hotels in Thimphu
Hotels established in 1974
1974 establishments in Bhutan